Colona Township is one of twenty-four townships in Henry County, Illinois, USA.  As of the 2010 census, its population was 6,822 and it contained 2,773 housing units.  Colona Township changed its name from Green River Township on April 13, 1857.

Geography

Cities, towns, villages
 Cleveland (partial)
 Coal Valley (partial)
 Colona

Unincorporated towns
 Briar Bluff at 
 Dayton at 
 Green Rock at 
 Level Acres at 
 Timber Ridge at 
(This list is based on USGS data and may include former settlements.)

Adjacent townships
 Hampton Township, Rock Island County (north)
 Hanna Township (northeast)
 Edford Township (east)
 Osco Township (southeast)
 Western Township (south)
 Rural Township, Rock Island County (southwest)
 Coal Valley Township, Rock Island County (west)
 South Moline Township, Rock Island County (west)

Cemeteries
The township contains these three cemeteries: Colona, Dayton and Glenwood.

Major highways
  Interstate 74
  Interstate 80
  Interstate 280
  U.S. Route 6
  U.S. Route 150

Demographics

School districts
 Geneseo Community Unit School District 228
 Orion Community Unit School District 223

Political districts
 Illinois's 17th congressional district
 State House District 71
 State Senate District 36

References
 
 United States Census Bureau 2008 TIGER/Line Shapefiles
 United States National Atlas

External links
 City-Data.com
 Illinois State Archives
 Township Officials of Illinois

Townships in Henry County, Illinois
Townships in Illinois